Janine Tavernier (March 23, 1935 in Port-au-Prince – February 27, 2019) was a Haitian poet, novelist and academic.

References

1935 births
People from Port-au-Prince
Haitian women novelists
Haitian women poets
2019 deaths